Maia Lumsden (born 10 January 1998) is a professional tennis player from Scotland.

Lumsden has won three singles titles and seven doubles titles on the ITF Circuit.
She made her WTA Tour main-draw debut at the 2019 Nottingham Open.

Early and personal life
Raised in Bearsden, near Glasgow from a family of five, her mother Gillian and father David brother Ewen and sister Eve, two and four years younger, respectively. Both siblings have played competitive tennis as juniors with Ewen progressing to the senior level. Educated at Beaconhurst School, Bridge of Allan later studying at nearby University of Stirling after returning to Scotland in 2016.

Junior career
Recognized as young as ten years old as the best in Britain in her age group and training at the national academy, University of Stirling, under coach Toby Smith with mentoring by Judy Murray who said at the time that Lumsden may need to train abroad to realise her potential.

By 2012, she was the No. 1 under-14 player in the Tennis Europe rankings and Under-14 champion at the Junior Orange Bowl beating Gabriella Taylor 6–3, 7–5, in an all-British final. The following year the two players teamed up to become under-16 British National Junior Champions in the doubles whilst Lumsden was also the under-16 singles champion.

Gabi Taylor, Katie Swan, Freya Christie and Lumsden were members of the 2014 British team, coached by Judy Murray, that triumphed in the Maureen Connolly Challenge Trophy, an annual under-18s competition against the USA.

She has won an ITF under-18 title in Malta and the Super Open Auray, and reached the third round in the girls’ tournament at Wimbledon.

Lumsden was a member of Great Britain’s University Tennis Team that won a gold medal at the Master’U BNP Paribas Tournament in 2017, and silver medal in 2018.

Senior career
As a 14 year old, she won her first matches at ITF level beating England's Pippa Horn and Oman's Fatma Al-Nabhani, the second seed and world No. 463, to qualify for the Pro-Series event at Scotstoun.

2017
Lumsden's first full year as a professional saw two individual title wins in Sunderland and the Wirral and six ITF doubles finals, three of them as winner.

2018
Entering her home competition in Scotstoun, Glasgow as a wildcard, Lumsden lost to her Spanish opponent Paula Badosa in the final of the GB Pro-Series Glasgow or Scottish Championships. In November, Lumsden claimed her first $25k title, beating former top 100 player Valeria Savinykh in the final.

2019
In February, Lumsden lost at the quarterfinal stage of the $60k Shrewsbury event to top seed Yanina Wickmayer. She made her WTA Tour debut at the Nottingham Open in June, after receiving a wildcard to the main draw of the tournament, winning her first match against fellow Brit Tara Moore, before losing the following day to top seed Caroline Garcia.

Performance timelines
Only main-draw results in WTA Tour, Grand Slam tournaments, Fed Cup/Billie Jean King Cup and Olympic Games are included in win–loss records.

Singles
Current after the 2022 US Open.

Doubles

ITF Circuit finals

Singles: 8 (3 titles, 5 runner–ups)

Doubles: 14 (7 titles, 7 runner–ups)

References

External links

 
 
 

1998 births
Living people
Scottish female tennis players
People from Bearsden
British female tennis players